Xavier "Xavi" Comas Guixé  (born July 29, 1977) is an Andorran ski mountaineer.

Comas started ski mountaineering in 2000 and competed first in the Trofeu CTP Boí Taüll race in 2001. He has been member of the national team since 2001 and lives in La Massana.

Selected results
 2005:
 7th, European Championship relay race (together with Toni Casals Rueda, Xavier Capdevila Romero and Joan Vilana Díaz)
 2007:
 7th, European Championship relay race (together with Toni Casals Rueda, Xavier Capdevila Romero and Joan Albós Cavaliere)
 2008:
 8th, World Championship relay race (together with Joan Albós Cavaliere, Xavier Capdevila Romero and Joan Vilana Díaz)
 2010:
 8th, World Championship relay race (together with Joan Albós Cavaliere, Joan Vilana Díaz and Toni Casals Rueda)
 2012:
 8th, European Championship relay, together with Guilad Dodo Perez, Ludovic and Joan Albós Cavaliere

Patrouille des Glaciers

 2008: 6th ("seniors I" class ranking), together with Joan Vilana Díaz and Joan Albós Cavaliere
 2010: 9th (and 7th "ISMF men" ranking)- with and end time of 6h58mn, together with Joan Vilana Díaz and Joan Albós Cavaliere

External links
 Xavier Comas at Skimountaineering.org

References

1977 births
Living people
Andorran male ski mountaineers